Treat Huey and Nathaniel Lammons were the defending champions but chose not to defend their title.

Stefan Kozlov and Peter Polansky won the title after defeating Andrew Lutschaunig and James Trotter 7–5, 7–6(7–5) in the final.

Seeds

Draw

References

External links
 Main draw

Columbus Challenger - Men's Doubles
Columbus Challenger